Scrobipalpa corleyi is a moth in the family Gelechiidae. It was described by Peter Huemer and Ole Karsholt in 2010. It is found in Portugal.

Etymology
The species is named for Martin Corley, who bred the species.

References

Scrobipalpa
Moths described in 2010